New Hampton Community School District (NH) is a school district headquartered in New Hampton, Iowa. It operates an elementary school, a middle school, and a high school.

It is mostly in Chickasaw County with a section in Howard County. In addition to New Hampton, the municipalities of Alta Vista, Ionia, and North Washington are in the district limits.

, the district had about 1,420 students.

Schools
The district operates three schools, all in New Hampton:
New Hampton Elementary School
New Hampton Middle School
New Hampton High School

By 2019, the district built a $19.4 million new middle school facility with an agricultural-industrial area and a gymnasium with a capacity of 400 more than the previous one.

See also
List of school districts in Iowa

References

External links
 New Hampton Community School District
School districts in Iowa
Education in Chickasaw County, Iowa
Education in Howard County, Iowa